Edward Long Fox may refer to
Edward Long Fox (psychiatrist) (1761–1835), English psychiatrist
Edward Long Fox (physician) (1832–1902), English physician